Paola Binetti (born 29 March 1943) is an Italian politician, psychiatrist and academic.

Biography
Binetti was born in Rome. She graduated in Medicine and Surgery in 1967 at the Università del Sacro Cuore in Rome, subsequently specialising in psychiatry and infant neuropsychiatry at the University of Navarra and the Sapienza University of Rome.

She has been a professor at the Campus Bio-Medico University, a private university in Rome founded by the Opus Dei, since its establishment in 1991.

She chaired the Committee Science & Life, which was created to oppose the 2005 Italian fertility laws referendum. She has been chairperson of the Italian Society of Medical Education and a member of the National Committee of Bioethics.

In 2006 she was elected to the Italian Senate with The Daisy, a centrist party which merged with others to form the centre-left Democratic Party the following year.

She is a numerary member of Opus Dei and has asserted that she wears a cilice.

She was re-elected to the Italian Parliament as a member of the Chamber of Deputies in 2008 and 2013, and again as a Senator in 2018.

In 2010 she left the Democratic Party to join the Christian-democratic Union of the Centre.

Controversies
On 3 March 2007, during a show on the La7 channel, Binetti said that gays and lesbians need medical care, maintaining that homosexuality is an illness.

References

External links
 Personal website
 Info on the website of the Italian Senate

1943 births
Living people
Politicians from Rome
Democratic Party (Italy) politicians
21st-century Italian politicians
Opus Dei members
Italian expatriates in Spain
Sexual orientation and medicine
Italian psychiatrists
University of Navarra alumni
Democracy is Freedom – The Daisy politicians
21st-century Italian women politicians
Italian women psychiatrists
Senators of Legislature XV of Italy
Senators of Legislature XVIII of Italy
Women members of the Senate of the Republic (Italy)